The Royal Yugoslav Air Force (VVKJ) operated the German Messerschmitt Bf 109E-3 fighter aircraft from August 1939 to April 1941. During that period, the VVKJ obtained 73 Messerschmitt Bf 109E-3s from Germany, marking the second-largest export sale of the model. When the country was drawn into World War II by the German-led Axis invasion of April 1941, a total of 46 Yugoslav Messerschmitt Bf 109E-3s were serviceable. They achieved some successes against Luftwaffe aircraft, but all Yugoslav Messerschmitt Bf 109E-3s were destroyed or captured during the 11-day invasion.

During World War II, the Yugoslav Partisans captured ten Messerschmitt Bf 109s. These small numbers were boosted by a 1947 agreement with Bulgaria, under which Yugoslavia eventually received about 120 G and K models to help equip the fledgling Yugoslav Air Force. Due to lack of spare parts, all Yugoslav Bf 109s were withdrawn from service in 1954.

Acquisition
In 1938, the VVKJ began modernising its fleet of aircraft. Following protracted negotiations, it ordered 50 Messerschmitt Bf 109E-3 fighter aircraft from Nazi Germany. This was followed by a further order of 50 aircraft. Between August 1939 and late 1940, a total of 73 aircraft were delivered under these contracts. This was the second-largest foreign purchase of the E variant of the fighter, after Switzerland.

Operational service

Royal Yugoslav Air Force
Once in service, the Bf 109E-3s were used to equip the 31st Fighter Group of the 2nd Fighter Regiment based at Knić, and the 32nd and 51st Fighter Groups of the 6th Fighter Regiment based at Prnjavor and Zemun, both on the outskirts of Belgrade. The Bf 109E-3 was also operated by the 702nd Liaison Squadron of the 1st Fighter Brigade based at Zemun, and the Independent Fighter Squadron of the 81st Bomber Group and the Air Training School, both based at Mostar. All of these aircraft were deployed in the fighter/interceptor role. Immediately prior to the German-led Axis invasion of Yugoslavia in April 1941, 64–65 of the original 73 Bf 109E-3s were serviceable. They were allocated as follows:

Commencing at 06:45 on 6 April, the Luftwaffe launched Operation Retribution, a series of concerted bombing attacks on Belgrade that coincided with air and ground attacks throughout the country. Several waves of German aircraft approached Belgrade during the day, initially Junkers Ju 87 "Stuka" dive-bombers escorted by fighters. All of the Bf 109E-3s of the 51st Fighter Group scrambled to meet the first onslaught, and they were soon joined by the Messerschmitts of 32nd Fighter Group. Seven claims were made by the pilots of the 102nd Squadron of the 51st Fighter Group, losing five aircraft in return. The 32nd Fighter Group Messerschmitts claimed another four bombers for the loss of two of their own, although several more Yugoslav fighters were hit and damaged. During the initial melee, Yugoslav anti-aircraft guns had fired at the Yugoslav Messerschmitts as well as the German ones, unable to distinguish between them.

Yugoslav Air Force

Surviving example

Footnotes

References

Books

Websites

Further reading 
 
 

Messerschmitt Bf 109
Royal Yugoslav Air Force
Yugoslav Air Force